Baryglossa histrio is a species of tephritid or fruit flies in the genus Baryglossa of the family Tephritidae.

References

Blepharoneurinae